Anaplastic carcinoma is a general term for a malignant neoplasm arising from the uncontrolled proliferation of transformed cells of epithelial origin, or showing some epithelial characteristics, but that reveal no cytological or architectural features associated with more differentiated tumors, such as the glandular formation or special cellular junctions that are typical of adenocarcinoma and squamous cell carcinoma, respectively.

Specific types include:

 anaplastic astrocytoma
 anaplastic large-cell lymphoma
 anaplastic meningioma
 anaplastic thyroid cancer

References

Carcinoma